Floweree is an unincorporated community in Chouteau County, Montana, United States. It is off of U.S. Route 87.

The community is named for Daniel Floweree, a Texas cattle rancher who established his F Triangle Ranch in the area in the late 19th century. Floweree had its own post office from 1910 to 2004 and still has its own ZIP code, 59440.

Demographics

References

Unincorporated communities in Chouteau County, Montana
Unincorporated communities in Montana